Kotsiubynske is an urban-type settlement and municipality in Bucha Raion, Kyiv Oblast (province) of Ukraine. The municipality is an enclave and located outside the borders of Kyiv Oblast, instead fully surrounded by the nation's capital Kyiv (Svyatoshyne Raion). It is the only locality in Kotsiubynske settlement hromada, one of the hromadas of Ukraine. Population: .

History
The settlement appeared in 1900 as a khutir Berkovets during the construction of the railroad Kyiv - Kovel (1897-1903). The khutir consisted of a single homestead which served as a residence for local forest rangers in the Bilychi Woods. The settlement belonged to the Kyiv-Podil Administration of State Property. In 1903 near the khutir was constructed a passing loop which later transformed into a train station Bilychi. The station was named after a village that was located in close vicinity (today, part of Kyiv city).

On February 11, 1941 the khutir Berkovets was given a status of an urban-type settlement and renamed Kotsiubynske.

Until 18 July 2020, Kotsiubynske belonged to Irpin Municipality. In July 2020, as part of the administrative reform of Ukraine, which reduced the number of raions of Kyiv Oblast to seven, Irpin Municipality was merged into Bucha Raion.

Demographics
In 2001 the ethnic composition in the village was as follows: Ukrainians — 70%, Russians — 26%.

Quantity

By language

Notable people
 Maksym Rydzanych (1977–2015) – volunteer, participant in Russo-Ukrainian war. He died on March 20, 2015 near the Donetsk airport, during a clash, ambushed by Russian saboteurs while covering his comrades. He was born and buried in Kotsiubynske.

References

Urban-type settlements in Bucha Raion
Enclaves and exclaves